Gary Springs (also Brown Springs, Garey Springs) is an unincorporated community in Bibb County, Alabama, United States.

References

Unincorporated communities in Bibb County, Alabama
Unincorporated communities in Alabama